The 43rd Kerala Film Critics Association Awards, honouring the best Malayalam films released in 2019, were announced in October 2020.

Winners

Main Awards 
Best Film: Jallikattu
Best Actor: Nivin Pauly - Moothon
Best Actress: Manju Warrier - Prathi Poovankozhi
Best Director: Geetu Mohandas - Moothon
Second Best Film: Vasanthi
Second Best Director: Rahman brothers - Vasanthi
Best Child Artist Female : Anamiya (Aami) [film- samyayathra]
Best Supporting Actor (Male): Vineeth Sreenivasan - Thanneer Mathan Dinangal & Chemban Vinod Jose - Jallikattu, Porinju Mariam Jose 
Best Supporting Actor (Female): Swasika - Vasanthi
Best Screenplay: Sajin Baabu - Biriyaani
Best Lyricist: Rafeeq Ahamed - Shyamaragam
Best Music Director: Ouseppachan - Evidey
Best Male Playback Singer: Vijay Yesudas - Pathinettam Padi, Shyamaragam
Best Female Playback Singer: Manjari - March Randam Vyazham
Best Cinematographer: Gireesh Gangadharan - Jallikattu
Best Art director: Dileep Nath - Uyare
Best Editor: Samjith Muhammad - Lucifer
Best Sound Design: Anand Babu - Thureeyam, Humania
Best Makeup Artist: Subi Johal & Rajiv Subba - Uyare
Best Costume Design: Midhun Murali - Humania
Best Popular Movie: Thanneer Mathan Dinangal

Honourary Awards 
 Chalachitra Ratnam Award: Hariharan
 Ruby Jubilee Award: Mammootty
 Chalachitra Prathibha Award: S. Kumar, Nemam Pushparaj, Sethulakshmi, Kollam Mohan

References

External links
 "List of recipients of the Kerala Film Critics Association Awards" (in Malayalam)
 "Kerala Film Critics Association Awards 2019: Official press release" (in Malayalam)

2019 Indian film awards
2019